Pefferskop Pass is situated in the Eastern Cape province of South Africa, on the road between Seymour, Eastern Cape and Dimfield, Eastern Cape.

Mountain passes of the Eastern Cape